, born August 30, 1972 and known by his shikona  is a Japanese retired sumo wrestler from the city of Chita in Aichi Prefecture.  His sumo stable was Kitanoumi.
His real name is Zenji Kanesaku. His height is 184 cm (6 ft) and his peak weight was 240 kg. His highest rank was jūryō 2, achieved in the January 1998 wrestling tournament (basho in Japanese). His hobby is sleeping.

Career record
Career results: 381 wins, 376 losses, 17 missed bouts (91 tournaments).
Second-division results: 120 wins, 150 losses (18 tournaments). One of his best results was in the November 1999 tournament in Kyushu when he defeated Hayateumi and Kotomitsuki.

Retirement
After participating in the basho in January 2003, he fell to the third-lowest division and retired.

Post-retirement activities
For a while he ran a restaurant in Fukuoka where his wife's parents' home was, but thereafter closed it and worked as a security guard in Kyushu.

Other points to note
He was the heaviest Japanese-born sumo wrestler ever until surpassed by Yamamotoyama.

See also
Glossary of sumo terms
List of past sumo wrestlers

References

External links
 
 Sumo Tokyo

1972 births
Living people
Japanese sumo wrestlers
Sumo people from Aichi Prefecture